The Granite City Grizzlies are a basketball club based in Aberdeen, Scotland.  The senior men's team compete in Division 2 of the Scottish Men's National League.

History
The club was established in 2009 with a senior men's team, winning the Grampian cup title in their debut season. In 2011 the club welcomed its first senior women's team which had a successful first season taking home the Grampian league and Cup titles.

Season-by-season records

Players

External links

Basketball teams in Scotland
2009 establishments in Scotland
Sports teams in Aberdeen
Basketball teams established in 2009